Exogamy is the social norm of marrying outside one's social group. The group defines the scope and extent of exogamy, and the rules and enforcement mechanisms that ensure its continuity. One form of exogamy is dual exogamy, in which two groups continually intermarry with each other.

In social science, exogamy is viewed as a combination of two related aspects: biological and cultural. Biological exogamy is marriage of nonblood-related beings, regulated by forms of incest law. Cultural exogamy is marrying outside a specific cultural group; the opposite being endogamy, marriage within a social group.

Biology of exogamy 
Exogamy often results in two individuals that are not closely genetically related marrying each other; that is, outbreeding as opposed to inbreeding. In moderation, this benefits the offspring as it reduces the risk of the offspring inheriting two copies of a defective gene. Increasing the genetic diversity of the offspring improves the chances of offspring reproducing, up until the fourth-cousin level of relatedness; however, reproduction between individuals on the fourth-cousin level of relatedness decreases evolutionarily fitness. In native populations, exogamy might be detrimental if "the benefits of local adaptation are greater than the cost of inbreeding." However, non-native, "invasive" populations that have "not yet established a pattern of local adaptation" may derive some adaptive benefit from admixture.

Nancy Wilmsen Thornhill states that the drive in humans to not reproduce or be attracted to one's immediate family is evolutionarily adaptive, as it reduces the risk of children having genetic defects caused by inbreeding, as a result of inheriting two copies of a deleterious recessive gene.

In one Old Order Amish society, inbreeding increases the risk of "neonatal and postneonatal mortality." In French populations, people who reproduce with their first cousin develop cystinosis at a greater rate than the general population.

Cultural exogamy 

Cultural exogamy is the custom of marrying outside a specified group of people to which a person belongs. Thus, persons may be expected to marry outside their totem clan(s) or other groups, in addition to outside closer blood relatives.

Researchers have proposed different theories to account for the origin of exogamy. Edvard Westermarck said an aversion to marriage between blood relatives or near kin emerged with a parental deterrence of incest. From a genetic point of view, aversion to breeding with close relatives results in fewer congenital diseases. If one person has a faulty gene, breeding outside his group increases the chances that his partner will have another functional type gene and their child may not suffer the defect. Outbreeding favours the condition of heterozygosity, that is having two nonidentical copies of a given gene.
J. F. McLennan holds that exogamy was due originally to a scarcity of women among small bands. Men were obliged to seek wives from other groups, including marriage by capture, and exogamy developed as a cultural custom.

Émile Durkheim derives exogamy from totemism. He said that a people had religious respect for the blood of a totemic clan, for the clan totem is a god and is present especially in the blood, a sacred substance.

Morgan maintains that exogamy was introduced to prevent marriage between blood relations, especially between brother and sister, which had been common in an earlier state of promiscuity. Frazer says that exogamy was begun to maintain the survival of family groups, especially when single families became larger political groups.

Claude Lévi-Strauss introduced the "Alliance Theory" of exogamy, that is, that small groups must force their members to marry outside so as to build alliances with other groups. According to this theory, groups that engaged in exogamy would flourish, while those that did not would all die, either literally or because they lacked sufficient ties for cultural and economic exchange, leaving them at a disadvantage. The exchange of men or women served as a uniting force between groups.

Dual exogamy 
Dual exogamy is a traditional form of arranging marriages in numerous modern societies and in many societies described in classical literature. It can be matrilineal or patrilineal. It is practiced by some Australian tribes, historically widespread in the Turkic societies, Taï societies (Ivory Coast), Eskimo, among Ugrians and others. In tribal societies, the dual exogamy union lasted for many generations, ultimately uniting the groups initially unrelated by blood or language into a single tribe or nation.

Linguistic exogamy 
Linguistic exogamy is a form of cultural exogamy in which marriage occurs only between speakers of different languages. The custom is common among indigenous groups in the northwest Amazon, such as the Tucano tribes. It is also used to describe families in Atlantic Canada with a Francophone and an Anglophone parent.

See also 
 Chinese surname: surname exogamy in China
 Emmanuel Todd, author of several demographic-history textbooks on the impact of exogamy on political-religious ideology
 Endogamy
 Gotra: exogamous unit in India
 Heterophily
 Hypergamy
 Interfaith marriage
 Interracial marriage
 Kinship
 Miscegenation

References

External links 
 

 
Multiculturalism
Population genetics